Kaafiya The Poetry Festival is a literary festival held annually in New Delhi, India.

2015 Edition

Participants 
The following authors and literary personalities participated in the 2015 Kaafiya The Poetry Festival.   

 Deepti Naval
 Sukrita Paul Kumar
 Ashok Chakradhar
 Keki Daruwalla
 Arundhati Subramaniam
 Laxmishankar Vajpayee
 Suhail Hashmi
 Sumant Batra
 Dimple Kaur
 Raj Liberhan
 Peggy Mohan
 Rana Safvi
 Aditi Maheshwari

References

External links
 Official website
 

Literary festivals in India
Festivals in Delhi
Festivals established in 2015
2015 establishments in Delhi